The Boley Building in Kansas City, Missouri was designed by Canadian-born American architect Louis Curtiss and built in 1909. It was listed on the National Register of Historic Places in 1971. It is the world headquarters for Andrews McMeel Universal, parent company to Universal Uclick, Andrews McMeel Publishing and GoComics.

Architecture
The six-story steel frame building was constructed in 1909 and was designed in the Art-Nouveau style by architect Louis Curtiss. The building is one of the world's first metal-and-glass curtain-wall buildings and the first to use rolled-steel columns. It was listed on the National Register of Historic Places in 1971. 

The six-story building also features cantilever floor slabs, cast iron structural detailing, and terra cotta decorative elements. The interior of the building features many of the comic strips and other publications from Andrews McMeel Publishing including Calvin and Hobbes and Doonesbury.

References

Commercial buildings completed in 1909
Buildings and structures in Kansas City, Missouri
Commercial buildings on the National Register of Historic Places in Missouri
National Register of Historic Places in Kansas City, Missouri